Cee Nantana Ketpura (born 15 October 1993) is a former American badminton player who competed in international elite events. She was a 2010 Pan American women's singles champion and a bronze medalist in the mixed doubles with Sattawat Pongnairat.

References

1993 births
Living people
Sportspeople from Orange, California
American female badminton players
Badminton players at the 2010 Summer Youth Olympics
Thai emigrants to the United States
21st-century American women